Gnana Kirukkan is a 2014 Indian Tamil language drama film written, produced and directed by Ilayadevan. It was produced by Ilayadevan under the banner Thangammal Movie Makers starring Jega, making his debut in Tamil cinema, and Archana Kavi. The movie is loosely based on the real-life story of a man Ganesan who is still alive in his native town. The film was edited by Raja Mohammad and the song and background music score composed by Taj Noor.

Plot
Veera Perumal (Jega) was born to Ganesh (Daniel Balaji) and Thangammal (Senthi Kumari). At the time of the birth of the newborn baby, Ganesh turns retard and tries to kill the newborn but fails. Veera grows into a teenager and decides to leave the village and head to Trichy in search of a job and a better life. He finds a job as washing dishes in a hotel. Due to his hard work and loyalty, the owner promotes him as a roomboy in a lodge. Veera starts to save every penny so that he may return to his hometown to his family with many gifts. Due to unfortunate circumstances, he gets fired from his job and decides to travel to Chennai to find work. He meets Sumathi (Archana Kavi), an innocent but mistreated girl. Veera decides to help Sumathi and gains a liking for her. The movie revolves around how he helps her and tries to become her better half and a better person despite having been born of bad circumstances.

Cast

Jega as Veera Perumal
Archana Kavi as Sumathi
Sushmitha as Jyothi
Daniel Balaji as Ganesh
Thambi Ramaiah as Selvamani
Senthi Kumari as Thangammal
Sevazhai Rasu as Gurusamy
Seeniammal
Vijaya Ammal

Soundtrack
The soundtrack was composed by Taj Noor.

References

External links

2014 films
2010s Tamil-language films
Films shot in Tiruchirappalli